Actinocatenispora is a genus in the phylum Actinomycetota (Bacteria).

Etymology 
The name Actinocatenispora derives from Greek noun , a beam, ray; Latin noun , chain; Greek feminine gender noun , seed, and in biology a spore; resulting in New Latin feminine gender noun Actinocatenispora, spore chain-producing ray (fungus).

Species
The genus comprises the following species:
 A. comari Oyunbileg et al. 2021
 A. rupis Seo and Lee 2009 (Latin genitive case noun rupis, of a cliff, referring to the site from which the type strain was isolated.)
 A. sera Matsumoto et al. 2007 (Latin feminine gender adjective sera, late.)
 A. thailandica Thawai et al. 2006 (New Latin feminine gender adjective thailandica, of or belonging to Thailand, where the type strain was isolated.)

Phylogeny
The currently accepted taxonomy is based on the List of Prokaryotic names with Standing in Nomenclature (LPSN)  and National Center for Biotechnology Information (NCBI)
and the phylogeny is based on 16S rRNA-based LTP release 123 by The All-Species Living Tree Project

See also 
 Bacterial taxonomy
 Microbiology

References 

Bacteria genera
Micromonosporaceae